Pattukkottai railway station is a railway station serving the town of Pattukkottai in Tamil Nadu, India.

Location
The railway station is located on the Adirampattinam Road, Pattukkottai.

Lines
The station is a focal point of  Chennai–Rameswaram line. Due to the Karaikudi Jn to Thiruvarur Jn gauge conversion, the trains have been suspended for few years. The line is being converted to broad gauge at a high pace and is expected to be activated from June 2019.

Once the gauge conversion work is completed, Trichy railway division has plans to operate two trains between Thiruvarur and Karaikudi.

There are two proposed lines which have been approved by Indian Railways. One is Needamangalam Junction–Mannargudi–Pattukkottai branch line and the other is Thanjavur Junction–Pattukkottai–Karaikudi Junction branch line.

References

External links
 

Trichy railway division
Railway stations in Thanjavur district